The Medical Evacuation Vehicle (MEV) are assigned from the Battalion Aid Station for Battalion-sized units, and dedicated to each of the company-sized elements of the unit and provide treatment for serious injury and advanced trauma cases. Models with the double V-hull upgrade are known as the M1254 MEVV

General
Integrated medical evacuation support in the SBCT (Stryker Brigade Combat Team), as an integrated part of the internetted combat forward formation, helps the organic medic who accompanies the infantry soldier during dismounted operations. The Medical Evacuation Vehicle and its crew can move forward, covered by integrated overwatching fires which provide protection for the patient and medical team.

This capability keeps the other platforms of the formation free to sustain the integrated support of the assault. The evacuation will include emergency care en route enhanced by the medic and by a protected environment with adequate lighting and accessible medical equipment.

Operational capability
The Medical Evacuation Vehicle is the primary ambulance platform in units equipped with the Stryker family of vehicles. It is based on the infantry carrier variant. The commonality of the platforms reduces the maintenance footprint and variety of logistics support.

The Medical Evacuation Vehicle has an accessible attendant’s seat that allows the attendant to monitor patients.

The ambulance is marked with Geneva Convention insignia that can be removed or masked without altering the camouflage pattern. It has a hydraulically operated rear ramp. This reduces risk of exposure to hostile activity or inclement weather.

Sources
This article incorporates work from https://web.archive.org/web/20080516205926/http://www.sbct.army.mil/product_mev.html, which is in the public domain as it is a work of the United States Military.

See also
 XM1207/8 Medical Vehicle, U.S. Army Future Combat Systems variant canceled in 2009

References

Military ambulances
Post–Cold War armored fighting vehicles of the United States
General Dynamics land vehicles
Wheeled armoured fighting vehicles
Military vehicles introduced in the 2000s
Mowag Piranha